James Mario Matra (174629 March 1806), sailor and diplomat, was an American-born midshipman on the voyage by James Cook to Botany Bay in 1770. He was the first person of Corsican heritage to visit the future nation of Australia.

Biography
His father James was a member of a prominent Corsican family who had migrated to Dublin, Ireland in the early 1730s, where he studied medicine and changed his surname from Matra to Magra.  He moved to New York City, where his son James Mario Magra was born in 1746.  James Mario later settled in England.  Australian historians remember him for his misbehaviour aboard James Cook's Endeavour on its voyage of exploration to New Holland in 1768–70. Magra was suspected of snipping off the earlobes of Cook's drunken and alcoholic clerk after stripping him naked while he was drunk.  During this voyage, Magra became acquainted with Sir Joseph Banks, and their friendship lasted until his death. Circumstantial evidence has identified Magra as the anonymous author of A Journal of a Voyage Round the World, which appeared two months after his return to England in 1771, and which offered some details of Cook's voyage not found in other accounts.

In 1775, Magra petitioned the King to have his surname revert to its original form Matra, in order to claim a Corsican inheritance.

Matra was the author of the "Proposal for Establishing a Settlement in New South Wales" put forward in 1783, which the immediate forerunner of the official and semi-official "plans" was resulting in the foundation of the first Australian colony.

In a letter to the British Government in 1783, Matra discussed the potential commercial benefits to Britain of a settlement. He recommended that Britain should send American loyalists and/or convicts to settle at Botany Bay in New South Wales.  He looked forward to Australia as an asylum for "those unfortunate loyalists to whom Great Britain was bound by every tie of honour and gratitude and with visions, perhaps, of a reproduction of the life of the planters of Virginia and Carolina". He pushed the latter plan partly because he had aspirations to become the first Governor of the new penal colony.

His biographer, Alan Frost, in 1995, noted that "silence covered Matra's activities until March 1777", when he applied for leave from his post as consul at Teneriffe in the Canary Islands to deal with family matters in British-occupied New York.  He was embassy secretary in Constantinople 1778–80.  In 1786 Matra accepted the appointment of consul at Tangier, Morocco.  In October 1793 Matra married Henrietta Maxwell, daughter of the army victualling agent at Gibraltar.  They had no children.  He remained in Tangier until his death there on 29 March 1806.

James Matra is remembered in the Sydney suburb of Matraville, and in the islet of Magra on the Great Barrier Reef.

Published works
Matra, J., P.A. de Hondt, & T. Becket. (1771). A journal of a voyage round the world, in His Majesty's ship Endeavour, in the years 1768, 1769, 1770, and 1771 : Undertaken in pursuit of natural knowledge, at the desire of the Royal Society : Containing all the various occurrences of the voyage, with descriptions of several new discovered countries in the Southern Hemisphere ... : To which is added a concise vocabulary of the language of Otahitee. London: Printed for T. Becket and P.A. de Hondt ... MMS ID 991018348089702626
Matra, James Mario, et al. Nachricht Von Den Neuesten Entdeckungen Der Engländer in Der Süd-See; Oder, Auszug Aus Dem Tagebuch Des Königl : Schiffs The Endeavor, Welches in Den Jahren 1768 Bis 1771, Eine Reise Um Die Welt Gethan, Und Auf Derselben Verschiedene Bisher Unbekannte Länder in Der südlichen Hemisphäre Entdeckt Hat, Nebst Einer Kurzen Beschreibung Dieser Länder ...Und Einer Kleinen Probe Von Der Sprache Die in Jenem Theil Der Welt üblich Ist. Bey Haube Und Spencer, 1772. MMS ID 991013432619702626

References

Attribution 
 
 

1746 births
1806 deaths
British diplomats
British sailors
People of the Province of New York
British people of Irish descent
British people of French descent